Dunlop Sport is a British sports equipment manufacturing company established in 1910 that focuses on racquet sports, more specifically tennis, squash, padel and badminton. Products by Dunlop Sport include rackets, strings, balls, shuttlecocks, and bags. Sportswear and clothing line includes t-shirts, shorts, skirts, jackets, pants, socks, caps, sneakers, and wristbands.

Dunlop Sport is operated by SRI Sports, a subsidiary of Japanese conglomerate Sumitomo Rubber Industries, which acquired the Dunlop brand in 2017.

In the past, Dunlop also manufactured golf equipment.

History 

Dunlop was established as a company manufacturing goods from rubber in 1889. The company entered the sporting goods market in 1910, when it began to manufacture rubber golf balls at its base in Birmingham. The company introduced the Maxfli golf ball in 1922.

Dunlop extended into tennis ball manufacture in 1924. In 1925, F A Davis was acquired, which had tennis racket manufacturing expertise. Dunlop opened acquisition discussions with Slazenger in 1927, but without success. In 1928 the sports division became a subsidiary of Dunlop Rubber named Dunlop Sports. Headquarters were relocated from Birmingham to Waltham Abbey in Essex.

The Dunlop Masters golf tournament was established in 1946. It was sponsored by Dunlop until 1982, and is now known as the British Masters.

In 1957 Dunlop acquired the golf club manufacturer John Letters of Scotland. In 1959 the Slazenger Group was acquired. The Dunlop "flying D" logo was introduced in 1960.

In the 1970s and 1980s, Dunlop was slow to adapt to the new materials that tennis rackets were increasingly being made from, believing that wood would remain the dominant material.

In 1983 the John Letters golf club business was sold back to members of the Letters family. One year later, the sports businesses were merged to form Dunlop Slazenger.

In 1986, the parent company, Dunlop Holdings, was acquired by the industrial company BTR for £549 million. BTR cut marketing spending to just 8 per cent of sales and reduced investment in grass roots sponsorship and research and development. Steffi Graf's sponsorship money was cut so she defected to a Wilson racket.

In 1996 Dunlop Slazenger was acquired by the private equity firm Cinven for £330 million. To save money, Cinven moved production of Dunlop tennis balls from England to the Philippines. Slazenger Golf and Maxfli were sold off to reduce debt.

Sports Direct International bought Dunlop Slazenger for £40 million in 2004.

In December 2016, Sports Direct announced it had agreed to sell the Dunlop brand to Sumitomo Rubber Industries for £112 million ($137.5 million). Sumitomo already owned the rights to the sports as well as the rubber industries brand in most of the world. The sale is due to be completed by May 2017.

Sponsorships

Tennis

More tennis Grand Slams have been won with Dunlop rackets than any other brand.

Dunlop Sport is the current supplier for the Australian Open as well as the ATP World Team Championship in Düsseldorf. It is also the official supplier for all three clay court ATP World Tour Masters 1000 tournaments, which includes the Monte-Carlo Masters, the Rome Masters and the Madrid Masters. As for ATP World Tour 500 tournaments, it is the official supplier for the Barcelona Open.

Additionally, Dunlop is the official supplier for ATP World Tour 250 tournaments at the BMW Open in Munich, the Portugal Open and the Open de Nice Côte d'Azur. Dunlop Sport is also the official supplier of the WTA Tour Volvo Cars Open in Charleston, South Carolina.

Notable present and former players that have used Dunlop tennis rackets (and switched sponsorships) include:

Male 

  Jürgen Melzer
  Tommy Robredo
  Jamie Murray
  Jack Draper
  Philipp Marx
  Kevin Anderson
  Sanchai Ratiwatana
  Bjorn Fratangelo
  Donald Young
  Max Purcell
  Roberto Marcora
  Miomir Kecmanovic

Female 

  Wang Qiang
  Xu Yifan
  Heather Watson (to 2021)
  Misaki Doi
  Yui Kamiji
  Kurumi Nara
  Zarina Diyas
  Luksika Kumkhum
  Ann Li
  Taylor Townsend

Retired players

  Pat Cash
  Evonne Goolagong Cawley
  Lew Hoad
  Rod Laver
 / Alicia Molik
  Tony Roche
  Pat Rafter
  Mark Philippoussis
  Tiago Fernandes
  Nicolás Almagro
  Amélie Mauresmo
  Cédric Pioline
  Jaroslav Drobný
  Ross Hutchins
  Helen Jacobs
  Jonathan Marray
  Greg Rusedski
  Virginia Wade
  Marc-Kevin Goellner
  Steffi Graf
  Sjeng Schalken
  Tom Okker
  Agnieszka Radwańska
  Wayne Ferreira
  Dominika Cibulková
  Thomas Johansson
  Danai Udomchoke
  John McEnroe
  Martina Navratilova

Squash 
Notable players who use Dunlop squash racquets include :

Male 
  Ali Farag
  Nick Matthew
  Grégory Gaultier
  Diego Elias
  Eain Yow Ng
  Victor Crouin

Female 

  Nour El Tayeb
  Alison Waters

Former players

  Jonathon Power
  Amr Shabana
  Lee Beachill
  Stewart Boswell
  Simon Parke
  Alex Gough
  Sarah Fitz-Gerald
  Tania Bailey
  Madeline Perry
  Natalie Grinham
  Nicolette Fernandes
  Sarah Kippax
  Aisling Blake

Associations
 Professional Squash Association – Official ball
 Women's Squash Association – Official ball

Former sponsorships
 Deportivo Español
 Gimnasia y Esgrima de Jujuy
 Gimnasia y Tiro

See also
 Dunlop Sport (Australia)
 Dunlop (brands)
 Slazenger

References

External links

 

1910 establishments in the United Kingdom
2017 mergers and acquisitions
Badminton equipment manufacturers
British brands
British companies established in 1910
Clothing brands of the United Kingdom
Clothing brands
Companies based in Surrey
Companies established in 1910
Golf equipment manufacturers
Manufacturing companies established in 1910
Manufacturing companies of the United Kingdom
Sporting goods brands
Sporting goods manufacturers of the United Kingdom
Sports equipment makers
Sportswear brands
Tennis equipment manufacturers